The 2018–19 Ligat Nashim was the 21st season of women's league football under the Israeli Football Association. 

The defending champions were F.C. Kiryat Gat, having won back to back championships in 2016–17 and 2017–18.

Premier League

Leumit League

References

External links
Ligat Nashim Rishona Israel Football Association

Ligat Nashim seasons
1
women
Israel